Luisa Baptista (born 15 June 1994) is a Brazilian triathlete. She won the gold medal in the women's triathlon at the 2019 Pan American Games. She also won the gold medal in the mixed relay event together with Vittória Lopes, Kaue Willy and Manoel Messias.

In 2015, she competed in the women's triathlon at the Pan American Games held in Toronto, Canada without winning a medal.

She represented Brazil in the women's event at the 2020 Summer Olympics in Tokyo, Japan.

References

External links 
 

Living people
1994 births
People from Araras
Brazilian female triathletes
Pan American Games medalists in triathlon
Pan American Games gold medalists for Brazil
Triathletes at the 2015 Pan American Games
Triathletes at the 2019 Pan American Games
Medalists at the 2019 Pan American Games
Triathletes at the 2020 Summer Olympics
Olympic triathletes of Brazil
Sportspeople from São Paulo (state)
20th-century Brazilian women
21st-century Brazilian women